Micklethwaitia is a monotypic genus of legume in the family Fabaceae. Its only species, Micklethwaitia carvalhoi, is endemic to Mozambique. It is closely related to Annea, Gabonius, and Scorodophloeus.

Description

Distribution and habitat
Micklethwaitia carvalhoi is endemic to northern Mozambique, occurring in coastal dry forests in the Cabo Delgado and Nampula provinces. Although coastal, it prefers clay-rich soils, as opposed to sandy soils.

References

Detarioideae
Monotypic Fabaceae genera